The 1915 Wisconsin Badgers football team represented the University of Wisconsin as a member of the Western Conference during the 1915 college football season. Led by William Juneau in his fourth and final season as head coach, the Badgers compiled an overall record of 4–3 with a mark of 2–3 in conference play, placing sixth place in the Western Conference. Cub Buck was the team's captain and a consensus pick for the 1915 College Football All-America Team.

Schedule

References

Wisconsin
Wisconsin Badgers football seasons
Wisconsin Badgers football